The Chile men's national 3x3 basketball team for men is the basketball side that represents Chile in international 3x3 basketball (3 against 3) competitions. It is organized and run by the Federación de Básquetbol de Chile.

Tournament record

World Cup record

Summer Olympics

Pan American Games

See also
 Chile men's national basketball team

References

External links
Official website

3x3
Men's national 3x3 basketball teams